Dangerous Intruder is a 1945 American film noir directed by Vernon Keays, starring Charles Arnt, Veda Ann Borg and Richard Powers .

Plot
New-York-bound hitchhiker Jenny (Borg) is accidentally struck by a car. The driver, art dealer Max Ducane (Arnt), offers to take her into his home until she can resume traveling. Later, Ducane's wife is murdered and Jenny determines to find the killer. With the aid of detective Curtis (Powers), she discovers that Ducane is the murderer, having killed his wife in order to have the funds to finance his antique collection. When she tries to get away the murderer is killed in a car crash when trying to run her down.

Cast
 Charles Arnt as Max Ducane 
 Veda Ann Borg as Jenny 
 Richard Powers as Curtis 
 Fay Helm as Millicent Ducane 
 John Rogers as Foster 
 Jo Ann Marlowe as Jackie 
 Helena Phillips Evans as Mrs. Swenson

References

External links
 
 
 
 

1945 films
1945 crime drama films
American crime drama films
American black-and-white films
Film noir
Producers Releasing Corporation films
Films directed by Vernon Keays
Films scored by Karl Hajos
1940s English-language films
1940s American films